The 1974 Wisconsin Badgers football team represented the University of Wisconsin–Madison in the 1974 Big Ten Conference football season.

Schedule

Roster

Season summary

Minnesota
Billy Marek 304 rush yards, 5 TD

1975 NFL Draft

References

Wisconsin
Wisconsin Badgers football seasons
Wisconsin Badgers football